JK Vändra Vaprus is an Estonian football club based in Vändra.

History
Vändra Vaprus were founded on 30 September 2009 by Pärnu Vaprus in cooperation with the Vändra borough. The team represents the borough of Vändra in the Estonian football league system and the Estonian Cup games.  Vändra Vaprus are associated with the Pärnu Vaprus football academy and were the reserve team for Pärnu Linnameeskond. On 22 February 2013 the Estonian Football Association announced that Pärnu Linnameeskond will be relegated from Esiliiga to Esiliiga B and Vändra Vaprus, who finished 2012 II liiga West/South division third, will be taking their place in the 2013 Esiliiga season.

Their stint in the second highest division in Estonia came to an end in 2016, when they finished second to last. Although they were ninth for the third successive time, then on the previous occasions they got readmitted to the league. After the season, the players decided that they will be competing in Esiliiga B in 2017. The season in the third division did not start well (six losses from first nine games), but from May to August they were undefeated for eleven matches in a row. In the end of the season, they were constantly battling for a place in the top two, which they ultimately lost. Although their third-placed finish allowed them to get promoted to Esiliiga, Vaprus opted against it.

After an unsuccessful year, Vaprus again finished at the top of the Esiliiga B table. This time they decided to get promoted and competed in the 2020 Esiliiga season. They spent almost the entire year in the bottom three and finally, on 8 November, their relegation to Esiliiga B was confirmed.

Players

Current squad
 Updated 6 March 2016.

Vändra Vaprus in Estonian football

References

External links
 Official website 
 Team info at Estonian Football Association

Football clubs in Estonia
Association football clubs established in 2009
2009 establishments in Estonia